Pholidoscelis desechensis, the Desecheo ground lizard, is a member of the Teiidae family of lizards. It is endemic to Desecheo Island in Puerto Rico.

References

Pholidoscelis
Reptiles of Puerto Rico
Endemic fauna of Puerto Rico
Reptiles described in 1967
Taxa named by Harold F. Heatwole